Bellevue is a former provincial electoral district for the House of Assembly of Newfoundland and Labrador, Canada. As of 2003 it had 7310 eligible voters. The district was abolished in 2015 and replaced by Placentia West-Bellevue.

The district combines traditional fishing communities such as Southern Harbour and Arnold's Cove with the heavy industry of Come By Chance (an oil refinery) and Sunnyside (near the Bull Arm offshore fabrication site). 
It is also one of the few districts to have elected a member of the Reform Liberal Party - a breakoff bloc of the provincial Liberals led by ex-Liberal leader Joey Smallwood in the 1970s.

The communities located within the district; Arnold's Cove, Bay L'Argent, Bellevue, Blaketown, Chance Cove, Chapel Arm, Come by Chance, English Harbour East, Fair Haven, Garden Cove, Goobies, Grand le Pierre, Harbour Mille, Jacques Fontaine, Little Bay East, Little Harbour East, Long Cove, Long Harbour, Mount Arlington Heights, Monkstown, Norman's Cove, North Harbour, Old Shop, St. Bernard's, South Dildo, Southern Harbour, Sunnyside, Swift Current, Terrenceville, Thornlea.

Members of the House of Assembly
The district has elected the following Members of the House of Assembly:

Election results

|-

|-

|-
 
|NDP
|Michael Fahey
|align="right"|299 
|align="right"|5.49
|align="right"|-1.62

|}

|-

|-

|-
 
|NDP
|Moses Ingram
|align="right"|375
|align="right"|7.11
|align="right"|+2.56%
|}

|-

|-

|-
 
|NDP
|Lee Ingram
|align="right"|258
|align="right"|4.55
|align="right"|
|}

External links 
Website of the Newfoundland and Labrador House of Assembly
Newfoundland & Labrador Votes 2007. Canadian Broadcasting Corporation.

References

Newfoundland and Labrador provincial electoral districts